František Moravec CBE (23 July 1895 – 26 July 1966) was the chief Czechoslovak military intelligence officer before and during World War II.  He moved to the United States after the war.

Biography
In 1915, Moravec was drafted into Austro-Hungarian Army and sent to the Eastern Front, into Galicia. In September 1914, he fought at the Battle of Rawa. On 13 January 1915, Moravec was taken as prisoner by Russian troops and sent to the POW camp in Tsaritsyn. In 1916, he joined the Serbian Legion and fought in the Romanian Front, was moved from Archangel (Archangelsk) to Britain, and in 1917 joined the Czechoslovak Legions at the Salonica front. In January 1918, the legions were sent to the Western Front in France and, in summer 1918, to the Italian Front.

After World War I, he was sent to Slovakia to fight against the Hungarian and the Slovak Soviet Republic. After 1919, Moravec served as an army officer in Pilsen (Plzeň) and in 1928 he joined the military intelligence service and moved to Prague.

From 1937 to 1938, Moravec was deputy head of the service and head of its operations department, from January 1939 acting head of the service.

In the evening of 14 March 1939, he and 10 of his fellow intelligence officers secretly managed to fly away with the most valuable intelligence files and archives from Prague Ruzyně Airport to London Croydon Airport with a stopover in Rotterdam on ad hoc chartered KLM Douglas DC-3, as they knew in advance from their secret agents operating in Nazi Germany that the invasion leading to German occupation of Czechoslovakia was to be on March 15, 1939, at 6 a.m. Rescued files and archives were handed over to the British MI6 to be used against Germany.

In Great Britain from 1940 to 1945, Moravec served as the chief of the intelligence service of Czechoslovak Government in Exile. The headquarters of the military intelligence were in Porchester Gate in London, but from 1940 his private residence was in Addington, Buckinghamshire, near Aston Abbotts, where the exiled President of Czechoslovakia Edvard Beneš had his residence.

Moravec maintained secret radio contact with the Czech anti-Nazi Resistance group known as Three Kings Group from 1939 to 1942. He co-ordinated the Czechoslovak co-operation with SOE. He participated in planning and preparation of Operation Anthropoid resulting in the assassination of Reinhard Heydrich. He also planned the assassination of his namesake Emanuel Moravec, a traitor and Nazi collaborator who was also known as the "Czech Quisling".

František Moravec returned to Czechoslovakia in 1945 after the Nazi Germany defeat but left secretly again in 1948, shortly after the communist coup d'état. He settled in the United States, where he worked until his death as an intelligence advisor in the US Department of Defense.

On April 24, 2022, the dignified transfer of Moravec's remains from the United States to Czech Republic took place at Joint Base Andrews.

Works
 František Moravec (autobiography): Master of Spies, 1975, .

See also
 Czech resistance to Nazi occupation
 Occupation of Czechoslovakia
 Operation Anthropoid
 601st Special Forces Group

References

External links
 The story of military intelligence residence in Addington on website of Czechoslovak Government in Exile Research Society
 Biography of František Moravec   
 Biography

1895 births
1966 deaths
Czechoslovak soldiers
Czech resistance members
Czech people of World War II
Czechoslovak military personnel of World War II
Recipients of the Milan Rastislav Stefanik Order
Commanders of the Order of the British Empire
People from Čáslav